Trevor Andrew (born 31 August 1979) is a Canadian snowboarder, musician and artist. He competed at the 1998 Winter Olympics and the 2002 Winter Olympics.  After an injury in 2005 he turned his attention to music, signing with Virgin Records and re-releasing his first album "Trouble Andrew" in 2009.

Snowboarding 
Whilst riding for Burton Snowboards he competed in the 1998 Winter Olympics half-pipe event finishing in 29th Place and the 2002 Winter Olympics half-pipe event finishing in 9th place. In 2004 after an injury which saw him break six ribs and crack vertebra he retired from professional competition.

Guccighost 
In 2012 Trevor came up with the alter ego Guccighost as a last minute Halloween costume. Continuing to use this persona he started to spread the logo around New York City until in 2016 his unique designs caught the attention of fashion house Gucci which led to a ongoing collaboration. His work was displayed across the facade of the flagship Gucci Fifth Avenue Store for the launch official launch of the fall winter 2016 collection, and has been worn by a number of celebrities such as Rihanna, Beyonce, Madonna, Nas and Zoe Kravitz.

Art career 
Further artistic endeavors since then has seen his work displayed in galleries worldwide amongst them Deitch Projects, Milk Galleries and Modern Art Museum Shanghai.

In November 2020 Trevor released his debut NFT collection on Nifty Gateway which was followed up in March 2021 with his Can't Kill A Ghost collection which sold for a total of $3.1 million. Since those release he has continued to work within the NFT space and has release his work at Sotheby's and Christie's auction houses.

References

External links
 

1979 births
Living people
Canadian male snowboarders
Olympic snowboarders of Canada
Snowboarders at the 1998 Winter Olympics
Snowboarders at the 2002 Winter Olympics
People from Kentville, Nova Scotia
Sportspeople from Nova Scotia